The history of Christian flags encompasses the establishment of Christian states, the Crusader era, and the 20th century ecumenical movement.

National flags of predominantly Christian countries

Christian empires, such as the Kingdom of Georgia, which became a Christian state in AD 337, adopted Christian symbolism in its flag. Likewise, the flags of the Byzantine Empire often depicted "a bowl with a cross, symbol[ic] of the Byzantine worldly domination for centuries and of the ecumenical mission to spread Christianity to all the world".

Many officially Christian states and predominantly Christian countries have flags with Christian symbolism. Many flags used by modern nations have their roots in historical Christian flags used in historic Christian empires, such as the Byzantine Empire, or in crusader vexillology. All the flags based on the Dannebrog, including the Flag of Finland, Flag of the Faroe Islands, Flag of Iceland, Flag of Norway and Flag of Sweden contain a Christian cross, representing Christianity. The Union Jack of the United Kingdom, as well as its ancestral flags, "[make] reference to three Christian patron saints: the patron saint of England, represented by the red cross of Saint George, the patron saint of Ireland, represented by the red saltire of Saint Patrick, and the patron saint of Scotland, represented by the saltire of Saint Andrew." In addition, the Flag of Greece, as well as the Flag of Switzerland, contain a Christian cross to represent the faith. The "cross on the flag of Dominica represents Christianity while the three colours of which the cross consists stand for the Trinity" and the "coat of arms depicted on the Flag of Slovakia shows a double cross". The Flag of the Dominican Republic also depicts a Bible and a cross. The Flag of Georgia, Flag of Tonga, Flag of Moldova and Flag of Serbia all display a cross representing Christianity. The Flag of Portugal also has Christian symbolism, bearing the five wounds of Christ. The Flag of Vatican City features the keys of St. Peter, which were given to him by Jesus Christ, one or (gold) and one argent (silver), which represent heavenly and earthly power respectively. The flag also features a Christian cross, which surmounts the Papal Tiara.

Crusader era 

In the Middle Ages, Christian flags bore various types of Christian crosses. Military orders of Christian knights used these crosses in their flags. For example, the Knights Hospitaller (Knights of Malta) used and continue to use a Maltese cross in their flags.

Flags of Christian denominations
Many Christian denominations have their own denominational flag and display it alongside the ecumenical Christian Flag or independent from it.

Catholic Churches in communion with the Holy See often display the Vatican flag along with their respective national flag, typically on opposite sides of the sanctuary, near the front door, or hoisted on flagstaffs outside. Individual dioceses may also fly flags based on the diocesan coat of arms.

The Eastern Orthodox Church tradition, particularly jurisdictions of the Greek Orthodox Church under the direct authority of the Ecumenical Patriarch, often displays this flag. It is a Byzantine double-headed eagle on a yellow (Or) field.

Parishes in the Episcopal Church frequently fly the Episcopal flag, a Cross of St. George with the upper-left canton containing a Cross of St. Andrew formed by nine cross-crosslets (representing the nine original dioceses) on a blue background.

The Salvation Army has a flag with a blue border (symbolizing the purity of God the Father), a red field (symbolizing the blood of Jesus Christ), and a gold eight-pointed star (symbolizing the fire of the Holy Spirit). The star bears the Salvation army's motto, "Blood and Fire".

The Anglican Communion has a blue flag with a St George's Cross in the centre surrounded with a gold band with the wording, "The Truth shall make you free." in New Testament Greek on it. From the band sprout the points of a compass (symbolising the spread worldwide of Anglicanism). On the "North" of the compass is a mitre (a symbol of apostolic order essential to all Churches and Provinces constituting the Anglican Communion).

The Church of England uses the St George's Cross flag with the coat of arms of the individual diocese in the upper-left canton.

The Church of Scotland uses a Flag of Scotland depicting the Burning Bush (or Unburnt Bush, in some traditions).

The Church in Wales uses a blue Cross defaced with a gold Celtic Cross.

The Church of Ireland uses the St Patrick's Saltire but also uses the Compass-rose Flag of the Anglican Communion equally.

The Evangelical Church in Germany, a federation of Lutheran, Reformed and United Protestant churches, has a flag with a violet Latin cross.

Additionally, many Catholic, Protestant and Orthodox churches maintain the use of the Labarum, a historical symbol of Christianity, which is rarely used as a flag at present.

Christian Flag adopted by the Federal Council of Churches

In the beginnings of ecumenical movement in the late 19th and early 20th centuries, the Christian Flag was first conceived on 26 September 1897, at Brighton Chapel on Coney Island in Brooklyn, New York in the United States. The superintendent of a Sunday school, Charles C. Overton, gave a lecture to the gathered students and asked the students what an ecumenical flag representing all of Christianity would look like. In 1907, Overton and Ralph Diffendorfer, secretary of the Methodist Young People's Missionary Movement, designed and began promoting the flag. The Christian Flag intentionally has no patent, as the designer dedicated the flag to all of Christendom. With regard to the Christian symbolism of the Christian Flag:

The ecumenical organization, Federal Council of Churches, now succeeded by the National Council of Churches and Christian Churches Together, adopted the flag on 23 January 1942. Since then, the Christian Flag is used by many congregations of various Christian traditions, including the Anglican, Baptist, Congregationalist, Lutheran, Mennonite, Methodist, Moravian, Presbyterian, Quaker, and Reformed, among others.

The famous hymn writer, Fanny J. Crosby, devoted a hymn titled “The Christian Flag”, with music by R. Huntington Woodman, in its honour; like the flag, the hymn is also free use. On the Sunday nearest 26 September 1997, the Christian Flag celebrated its one hundredth anniversary.

See also 

Labarum
Islamic flags

References

External links 
Flags of the Crusades (1099-1291) - CRW Flags
Do You Know the History of the Christian Flag? by Professor Elesha Coffman - Christianity Today

Christian symbols
Christian